The 1977 European Aquatics Championships were held at the swimming complex Rosenlundsbadet in the southern Swedish city of Jönköping, from 14 August to 21 August. Besides swimming there were titles contested in diving, the women's event of synchronized swimming and the men's event of water polo.

Medal table

Swimming

Men's events

Women's events

Diving

Men's events

Women's events

Synchronized swimming

Water polo

External links
Swimming results

LEN European Aquatics Championships
European Aquatics Championships, 1977
European Aquatics Championships, 1977
S
Sports competitions in Jönköping
Aquatics Championships